Wasan Homsan (born August 2, 1991), simply known as Ping, is a Thai professional footballer who plays as a right back.

International career

In 2013 Wasan was called up to the national team by Surachai Jaturapattarapong to the 2015 AFC Asian Cup qualification.
In October, 2013 he debut for Thailand in a friendly match against Bahrain.
In October 15, 2013 he played against Iran in the 2015 AFC Asian Cup qualification. He represented Thailand U23 in the 2014 Asian Games.

International

Honours

Clubs
Bangkok Glass
 Thai FA Cup: 2014
 Queen's Cup: 2010
 Singapore Cup: 2010

Chiangrai United
 Thai FA Cup: 2020–21

References

External links
 Profile at Goal
https://th.soccerway.com/players/wasan-homsaen/157709/

1991 births
Living people
Wasan Homsan
Wasan Homsan
Association football fullbacks
Wasan Homsan
Wasan Homsan
Wasan Homsan
Wasan Homsan
Wasan Homsan
Footballers at the 2014 Asian Games
Wasan Homsan
Wasan Homsan